A Little Spice is the debut album released by the English R&B band Loose Ends. The original UK version was released in 1984 (some early pressings list "1983").

The following year, an alternative version of the album, featuring "Hangin' on a String (Contemplating)" in place of "Feels So Right Now" and a re-ordered overall track listing was released for the U.S. market. This album reached number five on the U.S. R&B chart in 1985, while the single, "Hangin' on a String", became a number one hit on both the U.S. Dance and US R&B charts. It was a moderate hit on the  Billboard Hot 100 charts. It is featured in the popular video game Grand Theft Auto IVs fictional Soul/R&B radio station The Vibe 98.8. Between the years 1991 and 2009 the album sold an additional 126,000 copies in the United States according to Nielsen Soundscan seven years after its initial release. The album remains uncertified with overall sells unknown.

Track listing

European version

North American version

Charts

Weekly charts

Year-end charts

Singles

Personnel

Loose Ends
Jane Eugene - vocals
Carl "Macca" McIntosh - bass, vocals
Steve Nichol - keyboards, trumpet, vocals

Additional personnel
Herb Smith - guitars
Ron Jennings - guitars, bass
Donald Robinson - flute
Bobby Malach - saxophone
"Doctor" Leonard Gibbs - drums, percussion

References

External links

1984 debut albums
Loose Ends (band) albums